Harry Rembrandt 'Rem' Fowler (1882 – 1963 in Birmingham, England) was a British motorcycle racer famous for winning the twin-cylinder class of the inaugural 1907 Isle of Man TT races

A skilled toolmaker by trade, H. Rem Fowler competed as a trials rider between 1903 and 1923 riding Ariel, New Hudson, and Rex motor-cycles and entered the first Isle of Man TT race riding a 5 hp Peugeot-engined Norton motorcycle.

During the First World War, Rem Fowler was involved in the calibration of gun-sights and during World War II worked in tool-making in the aero-engine industry.

After the war, as a frequent visitor to the TT races every year, he was presented with a Gold Medal along with former TT race winner Jack Marshall at the 1957 Golden Jubilee TT races.

Fowler died in Solihull Hospital on 13 February 1963 at age 80 having retired from work in November 1962.

Racing career

Twin Cylinder Race
Tuesday 28 May 1907 - 10 laps (158.00 miles) St John's Short Course.

TT career summary

Sources

1880s births
1963 deaths
Sportspeople from Birmingham, West Midlands
English motorcycle racers
Isle of Man TT riders